The Shackleton Fracture Zone (SFZ) is an undersea fracture zone and fault located in the Drake Passage, at the separation between the Scotia Plate from the Antarctic Plate. The Shackleton Fracture Zone runs in a northwest to southeast direction from the South American continental shelf to the South Shetland Islands.

See also
Ernest Shackleton

References

Geology of the Southern Ocean
Argentine Antarctica
British Antarctic Territory
Chilean Antarctic Territory
Fracture zones